Jeff Bowen (born August 30, 1971, in Baltimore, Maryland) is an American composer, lyricist and actor.  He is best known as one of the authors and stars of the Broadway musical [title of show].  He also wrote the music and lyrics to the musical, Now. Here. This. with his [title of show] collaborators Hunter Bell, Susan Blackwell, Michael Berresse, Heidi Blickenstaff and Larry Pressgrove.  The show was presented in June 2012 at The Vineyard Theatre. He is currently writing an original musical, Other World with Hunter Bell and Ann McNamee.

Bowen attended college at Stetson University in DeLand, Florida. He currently resides in Brooklyn, New York with his partner Michael Berresse.

Writing credits 
Music for Sparklefest 2000 at Dixon Place
Music for Avant-Garde-a-Rama in Sparklevision
Music for the short film Boat Mime
Music and additional lyrics for RG: The Musical
Music and lyrics for the musical [title of show]
Music and lyrics for BC/EFA's 2007 Easter Bonnet Competition opening number
Music and lyrics for The Actors' Fund 125th Gala opening number
Music and lyrics for The Vineyard Theatre's 25th Anniversary Gala ("Twenty-five Years Ago" and "Drive!")
Music and lyrics for the Broadway Bares 18: Wonderland opening number ("Come Inside My Hole")
Music and lyrics for the opening number of The 53rd Annual Drama Desk Awards ("We Are Here").
Music and lyrics for "Villains Tonight!" for the Disney Cruise Line.
TV Theme Song for the comedy series, Squad 85
Music and lyrics for Now. Here. This.

Awards and nominations 
2006 Obie Award for [title of show]
GLAAD Media Award Nomination for Outstanding New York Theatre: Broadway and Off-Broadway for [title of show]
Drama League Award Nomination for Distinguished Performance by an Ensemble Cast for [title of show]
2008 Jim Owles Liberal Democratic Club Human Rights Award
Named as one of the top 100 most interesting, influential and newsworthy people in OUT Magazine's 2008 OUT 100 issue

References 

American gay actors
1971 births
Living people
American musical theatre composers
American male musical theatre actors
LGBT people from Maryland